Scott Davis and Paul Wekesa were the defending champions, but did not participate this year.

Grant Connell and Glenn Michibata won in the final 7–6, 6–4 against Jason Stoltenberg and Todd Woodbridge.

Seeds

  Grant Connell /  Glenn Michibata (champions)
  Kelly Jones /  Robert Van't Hof (quarterfinals)
  Alex Antonitsch /  Tom Nijssen (semifinals)
  Kelly Evernden /  Nicolás Pereira (semifinals)

Draw

Draw

External links
 Draw

Seoul Open
1990 Seoul Open